The cuisine of Bahrain consists of dishes such as biryani, harees, khabeesa, machboos, mahyawa, maglooba, quzi and zalabia. Arabic coffee (qahwah) is the national beverage.

Bahrain is a small island state near the western shores of the Persian Gulf. Much of the cuisine of Bahrain is a mixture of Arabic, Persian, Indian, Balochi, African, Far East and European food due to the influence of the various communities present, as Bahrain was an important seaport and trading junction since ancient times.

Dishes

Some of the common dishes prepared in Bahraini households are:
 Masli – rice cooked with chicken, meat, fish or shrimp with the ingredients cooked directly into the pot
 Biryani – a very common dish, consisting of heavily seasoned rice cooked with chicken or lamb, originally from the Indian sub-continent
 Harees, – Wheat cooked with meat then mashed, usually topped with cinnamon sugar
 Jireesh (Yireesh) – a mash of cooked spelt with chicken or lamb, tomatoes and some spices
 Machboos – a dish made with mutton, chicken or fish served over fragrant rice that has been cooked in a well-spiced chicken/mutton broth
 Mahyawa – a tangy fish sauce
 Mumawwash, – rice cooked with green lentils and can be topped with dry shrimp
 Muhammar – rice dish made from local rice with dates or sugar and one of the most distinctive rice dishes in Bahrain, always served with fried fish, especially the net fish of Bahrain
 Quzi (Ghoozi) – Bahraini dish consisting of a roasted lamb stuffed with rice, meat, eggs and other ingredients
 Falafel (Arabic: فلافل )  – a dish consisting of fried chickpeas served as fried balls in sandwiches with vegetables; not originally from Bahrain but it is popular.
 Al-Mudalal (Arabic: المدلل) – rice cooked with herbs and mixed with small pieces of chicken, and then a special kind of butter, which is specially prepared for this dish, is added

Desserts 
 Ghuraiba – brittle cookies made from flour, butter, powdered sugar and cardamom, usually served with Arabic coffee
 Qirs altaabi - dish made of flour, eggs and ground cardamom to make a paste that is heated on a hot surface.
 Khabeesa – Sweet dish made of flour and oil.
 Gaimat, or luqaimat – Sweet fried yeast dumplings soaked in saffron syrup (sugar, lemon and saffron) or honey or date molasses
 Khanfaroosh, – popular fried dessert prepared using molasses or milk, usually served at breakfast with tea or coffee
 Zalabia – fried dough soaked in syrup (sugar, lemon and saffron) with a distinctive swirly shape

Typical Bahraini beverages
Qahwah is the national beverage while tea is drunk for hospitality. Other popular beverages include laban (a kind of salty buttermilk), yoghurt drinks, sharbat (sweet drinks) like the rose sharbat or rose with milk, and soft drinks.

Bahrain produces only a small amount of its food requirements due to limited land space and imports much of its food.

See also
 Arab cuisine

References

 
Middle Eastern cuisine
Arab cuisine